Broadside is a pop punk band from Richmond, Virginia. They were signed to Victory Records, and now signed to SharpTone Records, and were listed as one of the 100 Artists You Need To Know in 2015 by Alternative Press. By 2015, Broadside had no original members left in the band.

History 

Formed in 2010, Broadside have shared the stage with bands such as the Ataris, A Loss for Words, Such Gold, Title Fight, Forever Came Calling, and Polar Bear Club. In June 2011 the band self-released their five-song EP, Far From Home, which was then re-recorded in 2012 with five additional tracks to become their first full-length album by the same name and put out on independent Japanese record label Ice Grill$ Records.

In January 2013 the band announced they had recruited Ollie Baxxter as their new lead vocalist. In October they released a music video for "Storyteller", followed by a video for their original holiday-themed "Wish List" in December.

Broadside spent the first half of 2014 touring and playing shows with various artists including Of Fortune and Fame, Old Again, Battleghost. In October 2014 Broadside contributed a demo version of their song "Avery" in partnership with Hope For the Day and PropertyOfZack to help raise awareness for suicide prevention.

On March 10, 2015, it was announced that the band had signed to Victory Records, which was accompanied by pre-orders for Old Bones set for release on May 19, 2015, along with a music video for the new single "Coffee Talk".
In late September 2015, founding member Bassist Josh Glupker left for undisclosed reasons.

On June 16, 2017, the band released its second studio album, Paradise. On July 8, 2017, the album peaked at the No. 17 position on the Billboard Heatseekers chart.

On May 15, 2019, the band released King of Nothing / Empty.

The band is set to release their new album Into the Raging Sea on July 24, 2020.

Band members
Current
Ollie Baxxter – vocals (2013–present)
Pat Diaz – bass (2015–present)
Jeff Nichols – drums (2016–present)
Domenic Reid – guitar (2017–present)

Past
Bryant Leary – vocals (2010–2013)
Kyle Foundry – guitar (2010-2012)
Jade Estrella – guitar (2010–2013)
Josh Glupker – bass (2010–2015)
Andrew Dunton – drums (2010–2016)
John Painter – guitar (2012)
Niles Gibbs – guitar (2013–2017)
Dorian Cooke – guitar; vocals (2015–2019)

Timeline

Discography
Studio albumsOld Bones (2015)Paradise (2017)Into the Raging Sea (2020)
DemosFar From Home'' (2011)

References

American pop punk groups
Victory Records artists
Musical groups from Virginia